Middle Creek is a tributary of Schwaben Creek in Northumberland County, Pennsylvania, in the United States. The creek is designated as an impaired waterbody, with the cause of the impairment being siltation, low dissolved oxygen levels/organic enrichment, and vegetation removal and the source being agricultural activity. The creek is classified as a Trout Stocked Fishery.

Course

Middle Creek begins in a valley north of Hooflander Mountain in Washington Township. It flows west-southwest for several tenths of a mile before turning west-northwest and then north, away from Hooflander Mountain. In this reach, the creek receives an unnamed tributary from the right. It then continues flowing north for more than a mile, receiving an unnamed tributary from the left and another two from the right. It then turns west for several tenths of a mile and receives an unnamed tributary from the left before turning northwest. After a short distance, it reaches its confluence with Schwaben Creek.

Hydrology
Middle Creek is designated as an impaired waterbody due to siltation, low dissolved oxygen/organic enrichment, and vegetation removal. The source of the impairment is agricultural activity.

Geography, geology, and climate

Watershed and biology
The creek is entirely within the United States Geological Survey quadrangle of Klingerstown. The mouth of the creek is located within  of the community of Rebuck.

The watershed of Middle Creek is in the middle part of the watershed of Schwaben Creek and in the lower part of the Mahanoy Creek drainage basin.

Middle Creek, like all other streams in the watershed of Schwaben Creek, is designated as a Trout Stocked Fishery.

History
Middle Creek was entered into the Geographic Names Information System on August 2, 1979. Its identifier in the Geographic Names Information System is 1181020.

See also
Mouse Creek (Schwaben Creek), next tributary of Schwaben Creek going downstream
List of rivers of Pennsylvania
List of tributaries of Mahanoy Creek

References

Rivers of Northumberland County, Pennsylvania
Tributaries of Mahanoy Creek
Rivers of Pennsylvania